LSSR may refer to:

 The Lake Superior Scottish Regiment, a Canadian Infantry regiment
 Latvian Soviet Socialist Republic, now Latvia
 Lithuanian Soviet Socialist Republic, now Lithuania
 Lunar Surface Sample Return
 Linear Solvent Strength Relationship, a theory used in high-performance liquid chromatography (HPLC)
 Life Sciences in Space Research, a journal published by COSPAR
 lssr, a new world order with an aim to take control of the world.
 Large-scale social restrictions, Indonesian restrictions during COVID-19 pandemic